Busagara is an administrative ward in Muhambwe Constituency in Kibondo District of Kigoma Region in Tanzania. 
In 2016 the Tanzania National Bureau of Statistics report there were 18,317 people in the ward, from 30,722 in 2012.

Villages / neighborhoods 
The ward has 3 villages and 27 hamlets. Prior to 2014 Nyaruyoba was a village within the Busagara Ward.

 Kifura 
 Busagara A
 Busagara B
 Kasanda
 Kibambo
 Kihera A
 Kihera B
 Kimanga
 Nyentamba
 Shuleni
 Songambele
 Kigendeka 
 Karundo A
 Karundo B
 Kumshindwi A
 Kumshindwi B
 Magarama A
 Magarama B
 Mumana A
 Mumana B
 Ntakama A
 Ntakama B
 Kasaka
 Mchangani
 Miheno
 Mpemvyi
 Mrangala
 Mugalika
 Nyakavyilu
 Nyamitelekelo

References

Kibondo District
Wards of Kigoma Region
Constituencies of Tanzania